Caburgua-Huelemolle consists of four groups of cinder cones, namely they are Volcanes de Caburgua, Volcán Huelemolle, Volcán Redondo and Pichares. Volcanes de Caburgua is a group formed by six pyroclastic cones located at the southern tip of the Caburgua Lake, which is a lava-dammed lake created by volcanic activity from the just mentioned cones. Volcán Huelemolle is a group of three cinder cones lying between the rivers Liucura and Trancura.

See also
List of volcanoes in Chile

References

Mountains of Chile
Cinder cones of Chile
Volcanoes of Araucanía Region